Crossroads (or Cross Roads) may refer to the following unincorporated communities in the U.S. state of Mississippi:

 Crossroads, George County, Mississippi
 Crossroads, Pearl River County, Mississippi